The music of Indiana was strongly influenced by a large number of German and Irish immigrants who arrived in the 1830s. A prime example is "I'll Take You Home Again, Kathleen" written by Thomas Westendorf, from Hendricks County, Indiana, in 1875.

Indiana was one of the first places where jazz music became popular outside of New Orleans and Chicago. In the late 1910s and through the 1920s the state had numerous bands of young musicians playing the new style for dancing.

Richmond, Indiana was home to Gennett Records, known for recording a wealth of jazz, blues, and country music in the 1920s. Gary, Indiana was home of Vee-Jay Records, known for blues, jazz, rhythm and blues, and rock and roll in the 1950s and early 1960s.

Indiana-born musicians and composers include John Mellencamp, Michael Jackson (also of Gary's The Jackson 5), Janet Jackson, Kenneth 'Babyface' Edmonds, John Hiatt, Steve Wariner, Hoosier Hot Shots, Harry Von Tilzer, Rich Mullins, Shirley Graham Du Bois, Hazel Harrison, May Aufderheide, Cecil Duane Crabb, Julia Lee Niebergall, Kris Roe, The Four Freshmen, The Ink Spots, The Spaniels, the Bill Gaither Trio, John Michael Talbot, Albert Von Tilzer, Cole Porter ("Night and Day", d.1964, buried in Peru, IN), Hoagy Carmichael (graduate of Indiana University, buried in Bloomington), Stuart Gorrell, Carrie Newcomer, Amanda Biggs, Janie Fricke, Lonnie Mack, Tiara Thomas, Henry Lee Summer; Axl Rose, Izzy Stradlin, and DJ Ashba (all of Guns N' Roses); David Lee Roth of Van Halen, Shannon Hoon (d. 1995, buried in Lafayette) of Blind Melon, Travis Meeks of Days of the New, Kyle Cook of Matchbox Twenty, Mick Mars of Mötley Crüe, and Michael Barber.

Additional musicians of various genres from Indiana include Bobby Helms ("Jingle Bell Rock" from '57; buried near Indianapolis), The Rivieras from South Bend ("California Sun" from '64, #5 on Billboard Hot 100), Junior Walker from South Bend ("Shotgun" '65, #4 on Billboard Hot 100 ), Junior Brown from the Bloomington area, After 7 r&b group with Babyface's brothers ("Can't Stop"), Days of the New from Charlestown ("Touch, Peel and Stand" '98, #1 on Mainstream Rock chart), The Ataris from Anderson ("The Boys of Summer" '03, #2 on Alternative Songs chart), country singer Jace Everett from Evansville ("Bad Things" (the theme song for True Blood '08), Umphrey's McGee from South Bend (singer Brendan Bayliss went to the University of Notre Dame), The Ready Set from Fort Wayne ("Love Like Woe" '10), and Chris Wallace ("Remember When (Push Rewind)") from 2012).

The Jackson 5's first 4 singles (including "I Want You Back" from 1970) reached #1 on the Billboard Hot 100, all on Motown records.
Michael Jackson (the "King of Pop", d. 2009) had 13 #1 singles (including "Billie Jean" in 1983), more than any other male artist in the Hot 100 era. He also had 2 #2 Hot 100 singles like "The Girl is Mine" with Paul McCartney in 1982.
Janet Jackson (now in the Rock and Roll Hall of Fame) has 10 #1 singles (including "All for You") on the Hot 100. Deniece Williams, also from Gary, had 2 #1 Hot 100 hits, including "Let's Hear It for the Boy" in 1984.
Van Halen (with David Lee Roth) had a #1 hit on the Hot 100 with "Jump", also in 1984. Guns N' Roses (with Axl Rose) had a #1 hit on the Hot 100 with "Sweet Child O' Mine." And The McCoys had a #1 Hot 100 hit in 1965 with "Hang On Sloopy." All of the above (and John Cougar Mellencamp, who had a #1 hit with "Jack & Diane" in 1982) are in the Rock and Roll Hall of Fame in Cleveland, except Deniece Williams, and The McCoys. John Mellencamp had 7 #1 songs on the Mainstream Rock chart in the 80s and early 90s. The John Mellencamp Pavilion at Indiana University was named after him.

Babyface, an R&B musician himself from Indianapolis, has written 7 #1 Billboard Hot 100 hits, including "I'll Make Love to You" by Boyz II Men in 1994. A 25-mile stretch of I-65 through Indy was renamed Kenneth "Babyface" Edmonds Highway.

FreshDuzIt, a hip-hop musician himself from Indianapolis, Producer of 2x Platinum single "Camelot', which reached No. 37 on Billboard magazine's Hot 100 chart, a rare accomplishment for any tune associated with an Indianapolis hip-hop act.

Though born in Oklahoma, gospel singer Sandi Patty began her musical career in Indiana at Anderson University.

Country music is very thick in Southern Indiana, an area considered part of the Upland South.

The bluegrass festival Bill Monroe Memorial Festival has been held in Bean Blossom, IN every June since 1967.There were many Rock N Roll Bars Nite Clubs and Venues in the 70’s in and around the Indianapolis area. All you had to do was draw the Big crowd and Rock the House. One such band was The Dave Lady Band.

Indigenous music

Jazz
Jazz artists from Indiana include J. Russel Robinson, Eddie Condon, Monk Montgomery, Wes Montgomery, Buddy Montgomery, J. J. Johnson, Freddie Hubbard, Carl Perkins, Cal Collins, Royce Campbell, Noble Sissle, Claude Thornhill, Larry Ridley, Gary Burton, Jane Jarvis, Leroy Vinnegar, Pete Candoli, Conte Candoli, Jamey Aebersold, Andy Simpkins, and David Baker.

Punk rock
In Indianapolis, a vibrant 1970s punk rock and new wave scene existed, including Latex Novelties, Joint Chiefs of Staff, and Dow Jones and the Industrials (from West Lafayette).  One of the most influential Indiana punk bands was The Gizmos, from Bloomington, who spawned a thriving local alternative scene that included the likes of Amoebas in Chaos and The Dancing Cigarettes.  Later, a hardcore punk and alternative rock band from Indianapolis called the Zero Boys became the single most important punk band ever to arise from the state.  The Zero Boys started trying to make a local hardcore scene after seeing the Dead Kennedys in Chicago.  Paul Mahern of the Zero Boys led the effort, and founded Affirmation Records, releasing several compilations and recordings from Articles of Faith (from Chicago) and local band Killing Children before going out of business. Indianapolis/Bloomington is home to post-hardcore/emo band Split Lip/Chamberlain who helped influence other emo contemporaries in the midwest such as Braid and The Get Up Kids. The Ataris formed in Anderson in the mid-90s by Anderson native Kristopher Roe. 
 
Bloomington has a large folk punk music scene. The town is home to Chris Clavin who runs the DIY punk rock record label Plan-It-X Records and is in the band Ghost Mice. Every other year Plan-It-X Records organizes Plan-it-X Fest, a large DIY punk music festival held in Bloomington. Bloomington is also home to the record labels Secretly Canadian, Jagjaguwar, and BlueSanct. From Kokomo , another folk punk group is Harley Poe fronted by Joe Whiteford.

Lafayette is the home of Mass Giorgini's (of Squirtgun, Screeching Weasel, and Common Rider fame) Sonic Iguana Studios. Several legendary national and international punk bands have recorded or mastered their releases at Sonic Iguana, including platinum-selling acts such as Rise Against. Lafayette / West Lafayette is home to punk rock record label Oi! the boat records whose roster includes bands from around the US and Europe. In the 1980s, the Lafayette music scene featured bands such as Rattail Grenadier (later Squirtgun), Stone Soup (featuring Carrie Newcomer), East of Eden (with Newcomer's husband and guitarist Rob Meitus on guitar), and Styff Kytten (featuring Shannon Hoon later of Blind Melon. Izzy Stradlin and Axl Rose, both of whom went on to form Hollywood Rose and Guns N' Roses also emerged from the Lafayette music scene in the 1980s.

In Northern Indiana, South Bend is home of Plinko Productions, led by Garth Plinko who recorded many of South Bend's punk bands throughout the 1990s.  Garth is also the founding member of the Urinal Mints, who have toured all over the US and Europe. The band released four CDs: Vulgar Display of Ass, Minty Fresh and In the Flesh (Live CD), Fourteen'll Getcha Twenty, and Own Your Soul. The Urinal Mints are the main reason the Northern Indiana punk scene prospered in the late 1990s and 2000s, by bringing in several national touring acts, hosting shows, and building a network with other Midwest bands. Plinko Productions is also responsible for the Shit Like a Champion series, the very first local punk rock compilations. Wrecked Hooligan Records came into being in 2012 and has since released compilations titled No Coast, No Problem which features many of the South Bend punk bands, as well as bands throughout the Midwest. South Bend was also home to The Aakata's. The Aakata's are widely credited with keeping the punk torch lit in northern Indiana. From their earliest days as a band, The Aakata's stood apart from their punk peers with their musicianship, as well as their lyrics. The Aakata's style often draws comparison with the Clash and Sex Pistols. The Aakata's emerged as a response to what was perceived to be the increasingly safe and bloated punk rock, heavy metal and manufactured alternative music of the mid-1990s. The band created various controversies during their career which captivated the Indiana punk scene, but often eclipsed their music. Their shows and tours repeatedly faced difficulties from authorities, and public appearances often ended in disaster and riot. The group went on hiatus in 2004.

Music groups from the MySpace music era originated in Greenwood, Indiana such as crunkcore group Dot Dot Curve.

Hardcore
The Hardcore music scene has been flourishing in Indiana cities such as Indianapolis, Bloomington, Muncie, Fort Wayne, and Richmond since the 1980s, and also in other parts of the state such as Northwest Indiana.

This is due to access at one time to small independent record stores such as Hegewisch Records in Merrillville, distros at shows, tape trading, word of mouth, flyering, the tenacity of die-hard music fans and musicians and more recently the internet.

Northwest Indiana in particular was a hotbed for Hardcore due to its already established metal scene and place in the urban decay of the rust belt. It really took off in the 1990s with the bands Right Arm Death Threat from Laporte and Take A Stand from Michigan City. Having members that had lived in New York and Chicago and being influenced first hand by the scenes in those cities as well as the well established, known and thriving scene in Chesterton, its large number of bands for a small town, (Failsafe, Aberration, The Chesterton Hardcore Conspiracy, The Dan Light Quartet, The Big Red Music Company, Suicide Note, and Until I Died just to name a few) its DIY ethic, and number of National and International acts playing mainly at the Westport Community Center on their way to or from Chicago.

Being in a cover band saturated market, members of these bands started networking across the region and started booking shows for their own bands as well as bringing acts from other cities and far away places. It soon took off and there were shows every other week and bands popping up every day. Strong connections to nearby already established scenes in Chicago, South Bend, Indianapolis and Detroit were made and growth continued producing even more bands such as After The Quarrel, Shut The Fuck Up, and most notably Blood In/ Blood Out. Apathy, commercialism and violence marred the scene during the 2000’s and as with any punk genre and subcultures in general people come and go, personal lives take precedence over participation, and Things change but, the majority of the stalwarts remain and the ball keeps rolling with shows in Hammond and Gary and new bands such as No Dice and All These Years and Nothing, plus strong ties to the Heavy Metal and Hip-hop communities, as well as international ties to the Punk and Hardcore scene from the years of hard work, perseverance and resistance to the powers that be.

Hip hop music
 In 1993, independent label Pump the Mix Productions released Firs' From tha Bend which is a 5-track EP consisting of tracks produced by DJ Machete and rapper Q-Swon, both natives of South Bend. Independent hip hop group The Mudkids hail from Indianapolis. Producer Elp-Mass and emcee Rusty Redenbacher made up the classic hip hop combo of emcee and dj/producer. Both artists are currently active in other musical endeavors. Indiana hip hop can be found mostly these days through Bringing Down The Band, a national and Indiana-based blog and brand founded in 2009. Notable Indiana-based independent hip hop artists include Freddie Gibbs, FreshDuzIt, Mark Battles and Kid Quill.

Indianapolis hip-hop act. Production team 1Mind — made up of Indianapolis natives Mac Sutphin, Sebastian Lopez and Michael Lohmeier — crafted the beat for "Unforgettable," a Top 5 hit for French Montana and Swae Lee in 2017.

Christian musicians from Indiana
 Bill Gaither & Gloria Gaither - Southern Gospel - Anderson
 Ernie Haase - Southern Gospel - Cynthiana
 Gwen Stacy - Hardcore - Indianapolis
 Haste The Day - Hardcore - Indianapolis
 Jeremy Camp - Pop - Lafayette
 Jody Davis - Rock - Petersburg
 John Michael Talbot - Contemporary Christian - Indianapolis
 John Schlitt - Rock - Evansville
 Plumb (singer) (Tiffany Arbuckle Lee) - Pop - Indianapolis
 Rich Mullins - Pop - Richmond
 Sidewalk Prophets - Alternative - Anderson
 Mark Stuart - Rock - Rockport
 Mason Proffit - Southern Rock - Indianapolis
 Tricia Brock - Rock - Dillsboro

See also
 "Back Home Again in Indiana"

References

 Blush, Steven (2001). American Hardcore: A Tribal History. Los Angeles, CA: Feral House. .
 Goshen, Larry, with Shaw, Mark (2002). Let the Good Times Roll: An Anthology of Indiana Music. Mentzer Printing. .
 Schiedt, Duncan P (1977). The Jazz State of Indiana. Indiana Historical Society. .
 Oi! the Boat Records website: www.oitheboat.com
 Rogers, Abbey. Abbey Rogers Midwest Showcase. Indy Hip Hop

 

 
Indiana culture
Indiana